Granville Eastman is an American football coach. He is the defensive coordinator at Alabama A&M University, a position he has held since the 2019 season. Eastman served the interim head football coach for one season, in 2018, at North Carolina Central University.

Head coaching record

References

External links
 Alabama A&M profile
 North Carolina Central profile

Year of birth missing (living people)
Living people
American football defensive backs
Alabama A&M Bulldogs football coaches
Arkansas State Red Wolves football coaches
Austin Peay Governors football coaches
North Carolina Central Eagles football coaches
Saint Mary's Huskies football players
Tiffin Dragons football coaches
York Lions football coaches